The apsar (āpsār) is a currency of Abkhazia. So far, only coins in denominations of 1, 2, 3, 5, 10, 20, 25, 50, and 100 apsars and banknote for 500 apsars have been issued. While the coins are legal tender in the Republic of Abkhazia, their usage is very limited, and the coins are mostly made for collectors. In Abkhazia, the Russian ruble is used in practice. The first apsar coins were introduced in 2008.

The name derives from the Apsars, a tribe mentioned in The Georgian Chronicles who inhabited the region in the Middle Ages and who are believed to be the ancestors of the Abkhaz people.

The Bank of Abkhazia is responsible for the apsar coins, and has so far issued two series: "Outstanding personalities of Abkhazia" (6 coins) and "The patriotic war of the Abkhaz nation 1992–1993" (2 coins). People who have appeared on coins include:
 Vladislav Ardzinba, 1st president of Abkhazia (1994–2005)
 Fazil Iskander, writer
 Dmitry Gulia, writer
 Samson Chanba, writer and statesman
 Bagrat Shinkuba, writer and politician
 Aleksandr Chachba, artist

10 and 100 apsar coins are made of silver; 25 and 50 apsar coins are made of gold. The number of coins produced is low: 2,000 silver coins are minted and 1,000 gold coins.

Issues

2008 commemorative coins of the 15th anniversary of the Abkhazian victory in the 1992–93 war

2009

Commemorative coins of Abkhazian writers

Commemorative Nart coin

2010

Commemorative Coins of 2010 Historic Monuments of Abkhazia

2011

Commemorative Coin of 2011 World Domino Championship

Commemorative Coins of 2011 Historic Monuments of Abkhazia

2012

Commemorative Coins of 2012 Historic Monuments of Abkhazia

Banknotes of the Abkhazian apsar
On September 29, 2018, the National Bank of the Republic of Abkhazia issued its first banknote for 500 apsars, in commemoration of the 25th Anniversary of the victory in the Patriotic War of the People of Abkhazia and its first president, Vladislav Arynba. 10,000 notes were printed, but were not released for general circulation.

References

External links

 
 Coins minted by the Bank of Abkhazia
 Catalog of the coins of Abkhazia (Numista)
 Catalog of the banknotes of Abkhazia (Numista)

National symbols of Abkhazia
Fixed exchange rate
Gold coins
Silver coins